Extracts from the Film A Hard Day's Night is an EP by the Beatles released on 4 November 1964 by Parlophone (catalogue number GEP 8920.) It was also released in Australia, Spain, New Zealand and France. All of the tracks also appeared on the A Hard Day's Night album.

Track listing 
All songs written by John Lennon and Paul McCartney.

References 

1964 EPs
Albums produced by George Martin
The Beatles EPs
Parlophone EPs